Kungens lilla piga is a children's song written by Anna-Lisa Frykman (1889-1960), describing a working day for a young housemaid girl working at the royal court.

The 1943 "Nu ska vi sjunga" Elsa Beskow illustration shows a little girl acting as the housemaid. Later, the song has been criticized for glorifying child labour.

Publications
Nu ska vi sjunga, 1943, under rubriken "Lekvisor"

Recordings
An early recording was done by Nadja Hjärne-Ohrberg with Stig Holm's ensemble on 28 September 1945, and the record came out in December the same year.

References

Swedish children's songs
Swedish-language songs
Year of song missing